Play with the Changes is an album by English electronic music duo 4hero, released via Raw Canvas Records in 2007. It peaked at number 91 on the UK Albums Chart.

Track listing

Charts

References

External links 
 

2007 albums
4hero albums
Contemporary R&B albums by English artists